Sadu is a commune in Sibiu County, Transylvania, Romania, at the foothills of the Cindrel Mountains, 27 km south of the county capital Sibiu, in the Mărginimea Sibiului ethnographic area. It is composed of a single village, Sadu.

In 1910 the village had 2,143 inhabitants.

Natives
The most notable people born in Sadu are:
 Inocențiu Micu-Klein, Romanian Greek-Catholic Bishop 
 Samuil Micu, theologist, historian, philosopher, member of Transylvanian School

References

Communes in Sibiu County
Localities in Transylvania